Conchita Martínez was the defending champion and won in the final 6–1, 6–1 against Magdalena Maleeva.

Seeds
A champion seed is indicated in bold text while text in italics indicates the round in which that seed was eliminated. The top eight seeds received a bye to the second round.

  Arantxa Sánchez Vicario (quarterfinals)
  Conchita Martínez (champion)
  Gabriela Sabatini (second round)
  Natasha Zvereva (semifinals)
  Magdalena Maleeva (final)
  Iva Majoli (quarterfinals)
  Lori McNeil (second round)
  Sabine Hack (second round)
  Judith Wiesner (second round)
  Amanda Coetzer (third round)
  Inés Gorrochategui (first round)
  Zina Garrison-Jackson (first round)
  Lisa Raymond (second round)
  Sabine Appelmans (first round)
  Sandra Cecchini (first round)
  Irina Spîrlea (third round)

Draw

Finals

Top half

Section 1

Section 2

Bottom half

Section 3

Section 4

External links
 1995 Family Circle Cup draw

Charleston Open
1995 WTA Tour